San Cataldo (Sicilian: San Catallu or San Cataddu) is a Sicilian town and comune in the province of Caltanissetta, in the southwestern part of the island of Sicily.

Physical geography 
San Cataldo rises in an internal hilly area, located at 625 meters above sea level, which extends north of the town, between the municipalities of Serradifalco, Mussomeli, Caltanissetta, located within the Sicilian Solfifero plateau, an ancient area mining. It is 63 km from Agrigento, 9 km from Caltanissetta, 50 km from Enna, 150 km from Ragusa. It is crossed by a single river, the "Salito", formed by springs that arise from the slopes of Mount Schiavo near the town of Santa Caterina Villarmosa. The inhabited area extends into the plateau located between Portella del Tauro and Babbaurra, rich in partially drinkable water wells.

See also
Catald, Irish monk and saint

References

External links

San Cataldo Selected Civil Records (Marriages and Deaths)
Cathedral of San Cataldo

Municipalities of the Province of Caltanissetta